Eois stellataria is a moth in the  family Geometridae. It is found in Peru.

The wingspan is about 24 mm. The forewings are dull chocolate brown, the costa and all the veins covered from the base to the margin by uniform pale yellow dots, representing a succession of pale lines. The hindwings are similar, but without prominent yellow spots. The basal half is speckled with pale.

References

Moths described in 1907
Taxa named by William Warren (entomologist)
Eois
Moths of South America